Peter K. Thomas was a Los Angeles-based teacher and lecturer of restorative dentistry, most active in the 1960s. He performed dental work on many Hollywood celebrities and received awards from dental societies throughout the world, being considered one of the finest clinical dentists of his time. The Thomas notches, shallow notches found "on both cusp ridges on unworn molars," are named after him. 

Thomas graduated from the University of Southern California in 1939.  On November 18, 1975 he was inducted into The Ostrow School of Dentistry of USC Hall of Fame.

References

American dentists
University of Southern California alumni
Year of birth missing
Year of death missing